The Allsvenskan is the highest tier of the national professional rugby union competition in Sweden. The first Swedish championship took place in 1943.

Allsvenskan 2017

Allsvenskan 2016

Past winners
Source:

References

Rugby union competitions in Sweden
Spain
rugby union
1943 establishments in Sweden
Sports leagues established in 1943
Professional sports leagues in Sweden